George W. Vaughn (1809 – March 1877) served as mayor of Portland, Oregon, from 1855 to 1856.  Born in 1809 in Blairstown, New Jersey, he moved to Portland in 1850.

References

1809 births
1877 deaths
19th-century American politicians
Mayors of Portland, Oregon
Place of birth missing